The Scotch Cap Light is a series of lighthouses located on the southwest corner of Unimak Island in Alaska. It was the first station established on the outside coast of Alaska.

History
In 1903, the Scotch Cap Light was built. The original lighthouse was a 45-foot (14 meter) wood tower on an octagonal wood building. According to the Coast Guard Historian's Office, the lighthouse was witness to several ship wrecks.

In 1909, the cannery supply ship Columbia wrecked. The 194 crew members were guests of the keepers for two weeks before a rescue ship could remove them. In 1930, the Japanese freighter Koshun Maru became lost in a snowstorm and beached near the light. In 1940, a new concrete reinforced lighthouse and fog-signal building was erected near the site of the original lighthouse. In 1942, the Russian freighter Turksib wrecked near the station. The 60 survivors lived at the station for several weeks because rough seas prevented a rescue ship from reaching the station.

The 1940 aid to navigation was the "twin" of the Sand Hills Light in Michigan's Keweenaw Peninsula, replicating much of its design.

On April 1, 1946, the station was destroyed by a massive tsunami created by a powerful earthquake. The entire five-man crew was killed; they were Anthony Petit, the lighthouse keeper; Jack Colvin, fireman first class; Dewey Dykstra, seaman first class; Leonard Pickering, motor machinist's mate second class; and Paul James Ness, seaman first class. This was the worst disaster to ever befall a land-based Coast Guard light station. Keeper-class cutter USCGC Anthony Petit (WLM-558), based in Ketchikan, Alaska, is named in honor of the fallen lighthouse keeper.

In 1946, in the wake of the tsunami disaster, a temporary unwatched light was established. The new permanent structure was completed in the early 1950s, and the temporary light was discontinued. The lighthouse was automated in 1971. A skeletal tower replaced the 1950s structure, and the fog signal was discontinued.

See also

 List of lighthouses in the United States

References
 "BMC Anthony Lawrence Petit and the Scotch Cap Lighthouse," Congressional Record, vol. 145, part 1 (1999), pp. 1305-1306,  https://www.govinfo.gov/content/pkg/CRECB-1999-pt1/html/CRECB-1999-pt1-Pg1305-2.htm.

External links

 Anthony Petit biography
 A Land-Locked Coastie — Scotch Cap Light Station
 An artist's depiction showing the tsunami wave just before impact
  Scotch Cap Lightstation Tsunami Disaster memorial page

Lighthouses in Alaska
Unimak Island
Buildings and structures in Aleutians East Borough, Alaska
Lighthouses completed in 1903
Rebuilt buildings and structures in the United States
Lighthouses completed in 1940
Lighthouses completed in 1950
1903 establishments in Alaska